"Set Fire to the Rain" is a song recorded by English singer-songwriter Adele for her second studio album, 21 (2011). The song was written by Adele and Fraser T. Smith while the production was handled by the latter. It became Adele's third consecutive US number-one single from 21 and reached the top ten in most of other foreign markets. It is a power pop ballad with lush instrumentation and a swelling string arrangement, in contrast to the understated production of most songs on the album. The song has received acclaim from various critics with many complimenting on Adele's vocals. "Set Fire to the Rain" was voted by readers of Billboard as their favorite number one hit of 2012. Though no official music video was released for the song, a live performance from the DVD Live at the Royal Albert Hall was uploaded to video-sharing website YouTube. This rendition won the Grammy Award for Best Pop Solo Performance at the 55th Annual Grammy Awards.

Background and composition

"Set Fire to the Rain" was written by Adele and Fraser T. Smith while the production was handled by Smith. "Set Fire to the Rain" was released as the third US single from the 21 album on 21 November 2011.

"Set Fire to the Rain" is written in the key of D minor with a tempo of 108 beats per minute, following three chord progressions. Adele's voice spans A3-D5. The song describes the contradictory elements of a relationship, and the impossibility of letting go which is displayed in the lyrics "You and me together, nothing gets better / But there’s a side to you that I never knew, never knew / All the things you'd say, they were never true, never true / And the games you play, you would always win." One of the most pop-influenced of the album, the song is characterised by John Murphy of musicOMH as a "power ballad". In contrast to the understated production of most songs on the album, the song features lush instrumentation and a swelling string arrangement over a mid-tempo rhythm, creating a wall of sound for the singer's mourning vocals. Dave Simpson of The Guardian in an article revealed that Adele got inspiration for the song "when mah lightah stopped workin' [sic]" in the wet.

Critical reception
The song has received acclaim from various critics with many complimenting on Adele's vocals but received comparisons to Bruno Mars's song "Grenade" due to the similar tempo, vocal range and scale. A writer for the magazine URB said that the song had "Starbucks-friendlier content" and further called it "melodramatic". Leah Greenblatt of Entertainment Weekly concluded that the song had "scorned-woman balladry" and it "surge[s] on the pure force of her titanic wail." The New York Times said "the vocal effects on 'Set Fire to the Rain,' produced by Fraser T Smith, the most pop-minded of the assembled team, are superfluous." John Murphy of MusicOMH gave a mixed review towards the song calling it "real misfire" and "overproduced". However he added, "it's a decent enough song, but Adele's always sounded best when it's just a piano and a voice." Writing for the newspaper Herald Sun, Camreon Adams called the song a "triumphant radio-hit-in-waiting of next single" and concluded that "once the chorus kicks in, you're a goner." Gary McGinley of No Ripcord highlighted "Set Fire to the Rain" calling it "the catchiest song" on 21. Another writer of Daily Herald said that Adele sounds "epic" on the song.
Allison Stewart of The Washington Post found the song to be "galloping, out-of-place synth-rock number" and added that "even Adele can't save" the song. Nick Freed of Consequence of Sound said that "Set Fire to the Rain" finds Adele at "her strongest and most open." He further called the song "one of 21s angrier tracks" and concluded: "The chorus' hooks are crazy catchy, and by the final one Adele releases and her hurt slips through the anger to give you a damn real and forward show of emotion. I’d imagine seeing this song live or in a stripped down setting would make one bawl like a child. You’ll want to pump your fist and pound your chest. That’s a guarantee." Robert Copsey of Digital Spy praised the song saying, "'It was dark and I was over/ Until you kissed my lips and saved me,' she admits over a gloomy piano riff, before launching into a ballsy, hands-in-the-air chorus. 'I set fire to the rain/ and I threw us into the flames,' she belts with growly vocals against cinematic strings. Rounding out with a suitably breathtaking blast from her impressive pipes and the result sounds like classic, though it's anything but camp."

Chart performance
"Set Fire to the Rain" was very popular in Europe, where the song charted within the top 10 of Austria, Denmark, Finland, France, Germany, Ireland, Italy, Norway, and Switzerland and topping the charts in South Africa, New Zealand, Belgium, Poland, Slovakia and the Netherlands. The song debuted at number 79 on the UK Singles Chart and it moved to number 44 the next week selling 6,286 copies. It later peaked at number 11 on the chart on the week ending 16 July 2011 and it stayed on the same position for two weeks selling another 24,978 copies.

Before being released as a single, the song charted on the Billboard Hot 100 for 6 weeks and re-entered 3 times, peaking at number 72 on 13 September.  On the issue dated 4 February 2012, "Set Fire to the Rain" peaked at number one on the Billboard Hot 100 and became Adele's third consecutive number one single from the album 21. With 21 also at number 1 on the Billboard 200, the song makes the set the first by a single artist to have led the Billboard 200 concurrently with three Hot 100 number one singles. It took 21 non-consecutive weeks for the song to reach the top spot in the United States. As of April 2020, it has sold 5,200,000 digital downloads in the United States. With this achievement, 21 became one of only seven albums to yield at least three number one singles during the decade; sharing the honour with Katy Perry's Teenage Dream (5), Rihanna's Loud (3), Taylor Swift's 1989 (3), Justin Bieber's Purpose (3), Drake's Scorpion (3) and The Weeknd's After Hours (3)

Music video 
No proper music video was shot for "Set Fire to the Rain" (as well as other singles from 21, "Rumour Has It" and "Turning Tables") as Adele had recently undergone vocal surgery. Instead, a live performance video was uploaded on YouTube to her Vevo account and has received more than 735 million views as of February 2023.

Accolades

Live performances and usage in media

Adele performed the song live for the first time on 29 April on The Graham Norton Show. She also performed the track on 3 May at Jools Holland along with the selections "Rolling in the Deep", "Don't You Remember" and "Take It All". Adele also added the song to the set list of her second worldwide tour.

It was featured on the international soundtrack of the 2012 Brazilian soap opera Avenida Brasil.

Notable cover versions
 On 2 September 2014, Danielle Bradbery, season 4 winner of The Voice in the USA, published a cover of "Set Fire to the Rain" on Vevo and YouTube; her performance was praised by Rolling Stone and the YouTube video accumulated over 700,000 views by May 2019.

Track listing
Digital and downloads
"Set Fire to the Rain" – 

Digital and CD EP — remixes

"Set Fire to the Rain" (Thomas Gold Remix) – 
"Set Fire to the Rain" (Thomas Gold Dub) – 
"Set Fire to the Rain" (Moto Blanco Remix) – 
"Set Fire to the Rain" (Moto Blanco Edit) –

Credits and personnel
Credits are taken from 21 liner notes.
Vocals – Adele
Songwriting – Adele Adkins, Fraser T Smith
Audio mixing, record producer, bass, guitar, piano – Fraser T Smith
Drums - Ash Soan
Recording engineer - Beatriz Artola 
Assistant recording engineer - Isabel Seeliger-Morley
String section performed by - Wired Strings
String arrangements - Rosie Danvers
String section recording engineer - Steve Price

Charts

Weekly charts

Year-end charts

Certifications

Release history

See also
List of best-selling singles
List of best-selling singles in the United States
List of Dutch Top 40 number-one singles of 2011
List of Ultratop 50 number-one singles of 2011
List of Ultratop 40 number-one singles of 2011
List of number-one singles of 2011 (Poland)
List of Billboard Hot 100 number-one singles of 2012
List of Adult Top 40 number-one singles of 2012
List of Mainstream Top 40 number-one hits of 2012 (U.S.)
List of Billboard Adult Contemporary number ones of 2012
List of number-one pop hits of 2012 (Brazil)

References

External links

2010s ballads
2011 singles
2011 songs
Adele songs
Billboard Hot 100 number-one singles
Columbia Records singles
Dutch Top 40 number-one singles
Grammy Award for Best Pop Solo Performance
Number-one singles in Israel
Number-one singles in Poland
Pop ballads
Songs about weather
Song recordings with Wall of Sound arrangements
Songs written by Adele
Songs written by Fraser T. Smith
Soul ballads
Ultratop 50 Singles (Flanders) number-one singles
Ultratop 50 Singles (Wallonia) number-one singles
XL Recordings singles